The Monument Nunataks are a group of nunataks in Antarctica that have numerous pinnacles and odd-shaped projections resembling monuments, situated at the northern extremity of the Mesa Range, north of Sculpture Mountain in the upper part of Rennick Glacier. The group was named by the Northern Party of the New Zealand Geological Survey Antarctic Expedition of 1962–63.

References

Nunataks of Victoria Land
Pennell Coast